Fruitvale may refer to:

Places

Canada
Fruitvale, British Columbia

New Zealand
Fruitvale Road railway station, Auckland

United States
Fruitvale, California (disambiguation), several places
 Fruitvale, Fresno County, California
 Fruitvale, Kern County, California
 Fruitvale, Oakland, California
 Fruitvale (BART station)
 Fruitvale Oil Field, underneath Bakersfield, California
 Fruitvale Bridge
Fruitvale, Colorado
Fruitvale, Idaho
Fruitvale, Tennessee
Fruitvale, Texas
Fruitvale, Washington

Other
 Fruitvale (album), a 2007 album by American musician Sonny Smith
 Fruitvale, original title of Fruitvale Station, a 2013 American independent drama film

See also